The 45th Grey Cup was the Canadian Football Council's (CFC) championship game of the 1957 season, which was played on November 30, 1957. The Hamilton Tiger-Cats defeated the Winnipeg Blue Bombers 32–7 at Varsity Stadium in Toronto.

This was the first Grey Cup game to be covered on coast-to-coast television.

The game is famous for a play in which Hamilton defensive back Ray Bawel intercepted a Winnipeg pass and raced unopposed for an apparent touchdown.  As he passed the Winnipeg bench, however, David Humphrey, a Toronto fan who was standing on the sidelines in front of the Winnipeg bench, put his foot out and tripped Bawel.  After the officials huddled together for a while to discuss the situation not covered by the rulebook, referee Paul Dojack assessed a penalty of half the distance to the goal line as a sort of compromise.  As it turned out, the incident had little effect as Hamilton scored on the ensuing drive and the game ended in a 32–7 rout for Hamilton.

References 

Grey Cup
Grey Cup
Grey Cups hosted in Toronto
Grey Cup 45
1957 in Ontario
Winnipeg Blue Bombers
1950s in Toronto
1957 in Canadian television
November 1957 sports events in Canada